The Arcata Community Forest is part of the parks and recreation system of the City of Arcata, California, United States. It was originally created in 1955 from six forest tracts: Gannon Tract, Burns Tract, Preston Tract I, Preston Tract II, Reclamation Water Co. Tract, and Brizard Tract. The park was the culmination of efforts to combine tracts of forest land located east of the city together in one continuous section of city-owned second-growth coast redwood forest. Over a 50-year period,  were obtained in several purchases. In November 2006, the  Sunny Brae Forest was added to the Community Forest. The city also owns and manages the  Jacoby Creek Forest.

Until 1964, this land was used as the municipal water source, obtaining its supply from Gannon Creek, Preston Creek (Jolly Giant), and Janes Creek. Historically, steelhead and salmon migrated upstream into all the creeks before logging and poor water quality wiped them out. It is currently used for education, recreation, wildlife habitat, and sustainable timber harvesting. Many of Arcata's small streams possess their headwaters in the Arcata Community Forest.

In 1979, the citizens of Arcata passed the "Forest Management and Parkland Initiative". The Arcata Community Forest was the first municipal forest certified in the US under the Forest Stewardship Council. This was intended to develop an ecologically responsible long-term forest management program to generate income to develop and acquire parkland. Generating $500,000–$700,000 of revenue per year from timber harvesting, the forest is self-supporting, and excess net revenue is used to maintain other city parkland and open space.
The forest is popular with hikers, birders, and has a history of (illegal) camping that remains unpopular with some locals who report being harassed or intimidated by the homeless that have "staked a claim" to both public and private property. According to the Humboldt Housing and Homeless Coalition (HHHC), 74% of homeless individuals were camping in Humboldt County. Approximately 15 illegal, two- to five-person camps are cleaned up annually by the Arcata City Police and Environmental Service Departments in the community forest.

Parking and main trail head can be accessed from an unmarked road at Bayview and E 12th St. The Redwood Lodge is located at the park; it is available for rent to host activities and contains tables, chairs, and a small kitchen with appliances.

Notes

External links
Arcata Community Forest
Arcata Community Forest Images By Jeff Schmitt

Arcata, California
Municipal parks in California
Protected areas of Humboldt County, California
Forests of California
Community-based forestry
Protected areas established in 1955
1955 establishments in California